is a Japanese footballer currently playing as a forward for Tochigi SC, on loan from Shonan Bellmare.

Career statistics

Club
.

Notes

References

External links

2000 births
Living people
Japanese footballers
Association football forwards
National Institute of Fitness and Sports in Kanoya alumni
J1 League players
Shonan Bellmare players